Clyde Caruana (born 21 February 1985) is a Maltese politician within the Labour Party, since November 2020 Minister for Finance and Employment.

Biography 

Caruana graduated with a bachelor in commerce from the University of Malta in 2002.

He worked as a statistician within Malta's National Statistics Office between 2007 and 2012, during which period he also graduated with a master in economics at the University of Malta in 2009.
He has since been a visiting lecturer in economics at the same university, with a specialisation in welfare.

Caruana also served as mayor of Żabbar between 2006 and 2009. He did not seek re-election for the post in the 2009 Local Council elections.

After leaving the Statistics Office, in 2012-2013 Caruana worked as consultant for Malta's General Workers' Union. Following the Labour Party's electoral victory in 2013, Caruana was appointed as chairman of Malta's Employment and Training Corporation, later renamed Jobsplus, which he headed till 2020.

Caruana was selected by Malta Prime Minister Robert Abela to serve as his chief of staff in January 2020. He succeeded Keith Schembri, who resigned in the wake of the 2019–2020 Maltese protests linked to the assassination of Daphne Caruana Galizia, and Mark Farrugia, who temporarily held the role in December 2019.

Caruana was co-opted into Malta's parliament in October 2020, together with former MEP Miriam Dalli, following the resignations of former Prime Minister Joseph Muscat and MP Etienne Grech.
Caruana was appointed Minister for Finance and Employment in November 2020.

References

External links 
 Website
 Twitter

1985 births
Living people
Labour Party (Malta) politicians
Maltese politicians
Government ministers of Malta
University of Malta alumni